Catherine Lough Haggquist is a Canadian actress, producer and entrepreneur. She has over 125 acting credits on film and television, including three seasons as Inspector Nora Harris on the sci-fi television series Continuum and recurring roles in Iron Man: Armored Adventures, Supernatural and Motherland: Fort Salem.

Early life 
Lough Haggquist was born and raised in Vancouver, British Columbia. Lough Haggquist founded Biz Books bookstore in Gastown in 1996 (which now operates online as BizBooks.net), to provide a devoted source for film, television, and theatre industry products.

Career
Haggquist has over 125 acting credits on film and television (to 2018). She has made appearances in seven Christmas TV movies. Lough Haggquist's first TV movie was Aurora Teagarden. In 2019, Lough Haggquist appeared in Endless and Love & Oatmeal. Lough Haggquist was formerly a National Councillor of the Alliance of Canadian Cinema, Television and Radio Artists and Vice President of the Union of BC Performers executive board.

Awards and nominations
Lough Haggquist is the producer of Reel Women Seen, a short film that has won numerous awards including the 2018 Jury Choice Award at the Diversity in Cannes Short Film Showcase. Lough Haggquist received the 2008 Women in Film and Television Vancouver’s Special Jury Award, and was named as the Union of BC Performers’ 2013 International Women's Day Honoree, being awarded Life Membership by UBCP in 2017. Lough Haggquist was honoured by UBCP/ACTRA in 2018, with a life membership for her commitment and contribution to the television, film and theatre industry.

Lough Haggquist was awarded honoured with the Lorena Gale Woman of Distinction Award (a distinguished lifetime achievement award) at the 9th Annual UBCP/ACTRA Awards in November 2020, which were handed out virtually because of the Covid-19 pandemic.

Filmography

Film

Television Film

Television Series

Video

Awards and nominations

References

External links
Catherine Lough Haggquist IMDb
Catherine Lough Haggquist website

Living people
Canadian television actresses
Canadian film actresses
Actresses from Vancouver
21st-century Canadian actresses
Year of birth missing (living people)